Richard C. Lamb (September 8, 1933 – February 10, 2018) was an American astrophysicist.

A native of Lexington, Kentucky, Lamb earned his bachelor's degree from the Massachusetts Institute of Technology. He began graduate work at the University of Kentucky after a stint in the military, earning a doctorate in 1963. Lamb worked for Argonne National Laboratory, the began teaching at Iowa State University until his retirement in 1996. Lamb later became a visiting professor at the California Institute of Technology. A member of the American Astronomical Society and the International Astronomical Union, Lamb was also granted fellowship of the American Physical Society.

References

1933 births
2018 deaths
American astrophysicists
Massachusetts Institute of Technology alumni
University of Kentucky alumni
Iowa State University faculty
Fellows of the American Physical Society
People from Lexington, Kentucky